This is a list of elections in Canada in 2009. Included are provincial, municipal and federal elections, by-elections on any level, referendums and party leadership races at any level.

March
 5 March: provincial by-election in Haliburton—Kawartha Lakes—Brock, Ontario
 8 March: 2009 Ontario New Democratic Party leadership election
 9 March: provincial by-election Restigouche-La-Vallée, New Brunswick
 17 March: Municipal by-election in River Heights-Fort Garry Ward of Winnipeg City Council
 24 March: Manitoba provincial by-elections in Elmwood and The Pas

May
 2 May: 2009 Liberal Party of Canada leadership election
 12 May: 2009 British Columbia general election and 2009 British Columbia electoral reform referendum

June
 6 June: 2009 Nova Scotia general election
 7 June: Saskatchewan New Democratic Party leadership election, 2009
 22 June: 2009 Quebec provincial by-elections in Marguerite-Bourgeoys and Rivière-du-Loup
 27 June: 2009 Progressive Conservative Party of Ontario leadership election

September

 14 September: Provincial by-election in Calgary-Glenmore, Alberta
 17 September: Provincial by-election in St. Paul's, Ontario
 19 September: Municipal by-election in District 6 (Dartmouth East-Lakes) on Halifax Regional Council
 21 September: Provincial by-elections in Regina Douglas Park and Saskatoon Riversdale, Saskatchewan
 21 September: Provincial by-election in Rousseau, Quebec
 26 September: Yukon New Democratic Party leadership election
 29 September: 2009 Newfoundland and Labrador municipal elections

October
15 October: 2009 Yukon municipal elections
17 October: 2009 New Democratic Party of Manitoba leadership election
17 October: 2009 Wildrose Alliance Party of Alberta leadership election
18 October: 2009 Action Démocratique du Québec leadership election
19 October: 2009 Northwest Territories municipal elections (taxed communities)
19 October: 2009 Iqaluit municipal election
20 October: Provincial by-elections in Antigonish and Inverness in Nova Scotia. 
27 October: Provincial by-election in The Straits - White Bay North in Newfoundland and Labrador
28 October: 2009 Saskatchewan municipal elections (urban municipalities)

November
 1 November: 2009 Quebec municipal elections
 2 November: Prince Edward Island municipal elections, 2009, excluding Charlottetown, Cornwall, Stratford and Summerside
4 November: 2009 Saskatchewan municipal elections (even-numbered rural municipalities)
 9 November: 2009 Canadian federal by-elections in Cumberland—Colchester—Musquodoboit Valley, Montmagny—L'Islet—Kamouraska—Rivière-du-Loup, New Westminster—Coquitlam and Hochelaga.
13 November: 2009 Green Party of Ontario leadership election
26 November: Provincial by-election in Terra Nova, Newfoundland and Labrador

December
7 December: Nunavut municipal elections, 2009 (hamlets)

See also
Municipal elections in Canada
Elections in Canada